Yevgeny Petrovich Klevtsov (28 March 1929 – 24 March 2003) was a Russian cyclist. He competed in the individual and team road races at the 1952 Summer Olympics, but without much success. He was selected for the next Olympics, but reportedly refused to go because he would not stand the long trip by sea to Melbourne, Australia. At the next Olympics, he won a bronze medal in the 100 km team time trial. Both in 1952 and 1960 he was the team captain and during the races did his best to "pull" his team mates. In 1952 his efforts were discarded by a crash that involved two riders of his team.

Between 1956 and 1958, he was a leading Soviet rider at the Peace Race, finishing within the top three places in eight stages and winning two stages. He retired shortly after the 1960 Games and worked as bicycle technician at CSKA Moscow. In 2008, an annual road race competition has been established in his native Oboyan in his honor.

References

1929 births
2003 deaths
Olympic cyclists of the Soviet Union
Cyclists at the 1952 Summer Olympics
Cyclists at the 1960 Summer Olympics
Olympic bronze medalists for the Soviet Union
Olympic medalists in cycling
Soviet male cyclists
Russian male cyclists
Medalists at the 1960 Summer Olympics
People from Oboyansky District
Sportspeople from Kursk Oblast